Events from the year 1970 in art.

JIMI HENDRIX

Events
 January 16 – John Lennon's exhibition of Bag One at the London Arts Gallery is shut down by Scotland Yard for displaying "erotic lithographs".
 October 26 – Garry Trudeau's comic strip Doonesbury debuts in approximately two dozen newspapers in the United States.
 November 27 – Bolivian artist Benjamin Mendoza tries to assassinate Pope Paul VI during his visit to Manila.
 Tom Keating admits that a number of watercolours in the style of Samuel Palmer were painted by him.
 Sammlung zeitgenössischer Kunst der Bundesrepublik Deutschland, the Federal collection of contemporary art, is established in Germany.
 Contemporary Art Museum of Macedonia in Skopje, designed by the "Warsaw Tigers" (Wacław Kłyszewski, Jerzy Mokrzyński and Eugeniusz Wierzbicki), is built.
 Conceptual Art and Conceptual Aspects, the first dedicated conceptual art exhibition, is mounted at the New York Cultural Center.
 Theodor W. Adorno's book Aesthetic Theory (Asthetische Theorie) is published posthumously in Germany.

Awards
 Archibald Prize: Eric Smith – Gruzman – Architect
 Prix Puvis de Chavannes – Daniel du Janerand

Works

 Gilbert and George – The Singing Sculpture (performance)
 Barbara Hepworth – Family of Man
 Alvin D. Loving Jr. – Cube 27 (Museum of Fine Arts, Boston)
 Henry Moore – Reclining Figure LH608
 Kanda Nissho – Indoor Landscape
 Isamu Noguchi – Night Wind
 Victor Pasmore – Apollo Pavilion (Peterlee, England)
 William Scott – Still Life With Orange Note (Arts Council of Northern Ireland)
 Aaron Shikler – Official portrait of President John F. Kennedy
 Robert Smithson – Spiral Jetty

Births
 January 17 – Genndy Tartakovsky, Russian-born American animator
 January 22 – Alex Ross, American comic book painter and illustrator
 January 24 – Maria Balshaw, English curator
 February 10 – Peter Richards, British artist and curator
 February 15 – Shepard Fairey, American artist, graphic designer and illustrator
 February 27 – Matthias Lechner, German set designer and art director
 March 12 – Marine Delterme, French actress, painter, sculptor and model
 May 3 – Jeffrey Sebelia, American fashion designer
 May 9 – Damian Loeb, American painter
 May 26 – Nobuhiro Watsuki, Japanese manga artist
 June 1 – Joshua Compston, British gallerist (d.1996)
 July 6 – Grant Bond, American comic book artist and writer
 July 9 – Benoit Pierre Emery, French art director and fashion designer
 August 4 – Pete Abrams, American webcomic writer and illustrator
 August 23 – Ben Eine, né Flynn, English street artist
 November 22 – Aleksander Balos, Polish-born American artist and figurative painter
 date unknown
 Helen Cammock, English artist
 Stéphane Ducret, Swiss contemporary artist
 Emily Jacir, Palestinian artist
 Tomoki Kyoda, Japanese animation director and animator
 Vincent Paronnaud, French comics artist and filmmaker
 David Quinn, Irish artist
 Bosco Sodi, Mexican-born abstract painter

Deaths
 January 27
 Rita Angus, New Zealand painter (born 1908)
 Erich Heckel, German painter and printmaker (born 1883)
 February 25 – Mark Rothko, Latvian-born American painter and printmaker (born 1903)
 February 26 – Ángel María de Rosa, Argentine sculptor and philanthropist (born 1888)
 March 2 – Marc-Aurèle Fortin, Canadian painter (born 1888)
 March 8
 Waldo Peirce, American painter (born 1884)
 Anton Räderscheidt, German painter (born 1892)
 March 22 – Georges Malkine, French Surrealist painter (born 1898)
 April 20 – Robert Laurent, American sculptor (born 1890)
 April 29 – Charles R. Chickering, American illustrator (born 1891)
 May 13 – William Dobell, Australian sculptor and painter (born 1899)
 May 29 – Eva Hesse, German-born American sculptor (born 1936)
 May 31 - Clare Sheridan, English sculptor and author (born 1885)
 June 3 - Roberto Longhi, Italian art historian curator (born 1890)
 June 6
 Camille Bombois, French naïve painter (born 1883)
 Signe Hammarsten-Jansson, Swedish-Finnish graphic artist (born 1882)
 June 27 – Edwin La Dell, British artist (born 1914)
 July 4 – Barnett Newman, American artist (born 1905)
 July 7 – Dame Laura Knight, English Impressionist painter (born 1877)
 July 13 – Lazar Drljača, Serbian painter (born 1883)
 July 30 – Maud Lewis, Canadian folk artist (born 1903)
 November 29 - Walter Stuempfig, American painter (born 1914)
 December 1 – Hermine David, French painter (born 1886)
 December 19 – Stig Blomberg, Swedish sculptor (born 1901)
 date unknown – Ze'ev Raban, Israeli painter (born 1890)

See also
 1970 in fine arts of the Soviet Union

References

 
Years of the 20th century in art
1970s in art